The 1984 East Carolina Pirates football team was an American football team that represented East Carolina University as an independent during the 1984 NCAA Division I-A football season. In their fifth season under head coach Ed Emory, the team compiled a 2–9 record.

Schedule

References

East Carolina
East Carolina Pirates football seasons
East Carolina Pirates football